Adai (also Adaizan, Adaizi, Adaise, Adahi, Adaes, Adees, Atayos) is an extinct Native American language that was spoken in northwestern Louisiana.

Classification
It was once proposed that there may be a connection between Adai and the nearby Caddoan languages, but this now seems unlikely.

Vocabulary
Adai is known only from a list of 275 words from 1804 by John Sibley. The manuscript word list below has been reproduced from Grant's (1995) transcriptions. (Note: Due to the poor printing in Grant (1995), the text below may not be entirely accurate and will need to be re-checked.)

Nouns

Adjectives

Pronouns

Verbs

Numerals

Others

References

 Campbell, Lyle. (1997). American Indian languages: The historical linguistics of Native America. New York: Oxford University Press. 
 Mithun, Marianne. (1999). The languages of Native North America. Cambridge: Cambridge University Press.  (hbk); .

External links 

OLAC resources in and about the Adai language

Unclassified languages of North America
Extinct languages of North America
Indigenous languages of the North American Southeast
Languages of the United States
Languages extinct in the 19th century
19th-century disestablishments in North America